Stock market index option is a type of option, a financial derivative, that is based on stock indices like the S&P 500 or the Dow Jones Industrial Average. They give an investor the right to buy or sell the underlying stock index for a defined time period. Because index options are based on a large basket of stocks, investors are able to gain exposure to the market as a whole and take advantage of diversification. Index options may be tied to the price of either "broad-based indexes" like the S&P 500 or the Russell 3000 or to "narrow-based indexes", which are limited to a particular industry.

The global market for exchange-traded stock market index options is notionally valued by the Bank for International Settlements (BIS) at $368,900 million in 2005. A stock index option provides the right to trade a specific stock index at a specified price by a specified expiration date.  A call option on a stock index gives you the right to buy the index, and a put option on a stock index gives you the right to sell the index.  Options on stock indexes are similar to exchange-traded funds (ETFs), the difference being that ETF values change throughout the day whereas the value on stock index options change at the end of each trading day. Therefore, profit/loss on an index option is based on the market's closing price for the day, not on any price during the market's open hours. If an index option is exercised before the close of the market, the buyer of the option will in- or out-of-the-money for an additional amount equal to the difference between the closing price and the exercise price. If the market closes above the intra-day exercise price, then the option will accrue an additional loss, and if the market closes below the intra-day exercise price, the option will accrue an additional gain. For this reason, index options are typically closed out after the market has closed.

See also 
 Derivative (finance)

References

Derivatives (finance)